Hanspeter Latour (born 4 June 1947 in Thun) is a Swiss football manager and former goalkeeper.

Coach career 
He has vast experience as a manager, having coached at the professional level for over thirty years in both Germany and his native Switzerland.

References

1947 births
Living people
Association football goalkeepers
Swiss men's footballers
FC Thun players
BSC Young Boys players
1. FC Köln managers
Grasshopper Club Zürich managers
FC Thun managers
FC Wil managers
People from Thun
Swiss football managers
Sportspeople from the canton of Bern